The Findel Glacier (German: Findelgletscher) is a valley glacier in the Monte Rosa massif east of Zermatt in the Pennine Alps.

From there the glacier flows to the west between the Rimpfischhorn and Strahlhorn on the north and the Stockhorn on the south.

In October 2009, a group of Swiss scientists from the University of Zurich carried out an experiment to measure the length of the glacier, comparing their results with a previous experiment in 2005. Their results showed that the glacier had lost 49 million cubic metres of ice, and has lost a quarter of its surface area since 1850.

See also
List of glaciers in Switzerland
List of glaciers
Retreat of glaciers since 1850
Swiss Alps

References

External links
Swiss glacier monitoring network
Swiss Scientists measure glacial melting with light 
Home
Interactive repeat photo comparisons of the Findel Glacier

Glaciers of Valais
Glaciers of the Alps